KWM may refer to:

 King & Wood Mallesons, a multinational law firm, headquartered in Hong Kong
 Kowanyama Airport, an airport southeast of Kowanyama, Queensland, Australia
 the previous name of KWin, a window manager for the X Window System